Back Street is an album by jazz saxophonist Lou Donaldson, his second recording for the Muse label, featuring Donaldson's quartet with Herman Foster, Jeff Fuller, and Victor Jones.

The album was awarded 3 stars in an Allmusic review.

Track listing 
All compositions by Lou Donaldson except as indicated
 "Be My Love" (Sammy Cahn, Nicholas Brodszky)   
 "Cheer Cheer"      
 "Now's the Time" (Charlie Parker)
 "Exactly Like You" (Dorothy Fields, Jimmy McHugh)     
 "Back Street"      
 "Confirmation" (Charlie Parker) 
 Recorded in Paris, France in 1982.

Personnel 
 Lou Donaldson - alto saxophone, vocals
 Herman Foster - piano
 Jeff Fuller - bass
 Victor Jones - drums

References 

Lou Donaldson albums
1982 albums
Muse Records albums